Red rock crab may refer to several species of crab:
 Cancer productus, common along the western coast of North America
 Grapsus grapsus, common along the western coast of South America
 Guinusia chabrus (formerly Plagusia chabrus), found in the southern Indian and Pacific Oceans from South Africa to Chile

Animal common name disambiguation pages